The University of Bamberg in Bamberg, Germany, specializes in the humanities, cultural studies, social sciences, economics, and applied computer science.

Campus 
The university is mainly housed in historical buildings in Bamberg's Old Town. These include the former Jesuit college (Theology), the former Hochzeitshaus (History), the old slaughterhouse (Earth Science), the former Bauhof (Communication Studies), and the former fire station (Oriental Studies). The departments of Languages and Literature are partly housed in buildings which once belonged to the Kaiser-Heinrich High School.
The Social Sciences and Economics department and the Business Information Technology and Applied Computer Science department, which accommodate a large proportion of the students, are in Feldkirchenstrasse. The former ERBA cotton mill, on an island in the Regnitz, has been acquired to create student apartments in the red-brick building, as well as in an adjoining new 14,000m2 building.

Organization 

The university today has four faculties:
Faculty of Humanities
Faculty of Social Sciences, Economics and Business Administration
Faculty of Human Sciences and Education
Faculty of Information Systems and Applied Computer Science

An agreement between Bavaria and the Vatican saw the faculty of Catholic Theology restructured as an institute which places a greater emphasis on teacher training. In 2005, the Social Work course transferred to Coburg University of Applied Sciences.

Academics

Disciplines 
Language-based area studies, including Oriental Studies and Slavonic Studies
Medieval Studies; Archaeology (Prehistoric, Roman Provinces, Medieval); Cultural Heritage Conservation
Behavioural sciences: Sociology, Political Science, Psychology
Economics and Business Administration, with an emphasis on European Economics
Applied Computer Science

The main areas of curricular focus, to which subjects across faculties contribute, are:
Education and Life Planning
The Individual and Society
Languages and Cultures
Business and Markets

Rankings and reputation 
In the 2012 Wirtschaftswoche ranking, the Faculty of Social Sciences, Economics, and Business Administration is ranked 20th in business administration (Betriebswirtschaftslehre) and 11th in economics (Volkswirtschaftslehre).

Partner universities 
The University of Bamberg currently has cooperation agreements with approximately 300 academic institutions in more than 60 countries (March 2018).

The European network includes the University of Cambridge and the University of Oxford. The University holds partnerships in Australia with the University of Sydney, in the US with Harvard University, as well as in Asia with the Chinese Xi'an Jiaotong University, the Korea University, and the Japanese Sophia University.

Johann Baptist von Spix International Professorship

The University of Bamberg created the Johann Baptist von Spix professorship in 2015. The professorship is named for an alumnus of the university and eminent biologist and ethnographer. The professorship was created in an effort to increase the institution's international scholarly collaboration. Recipients of the professorship teach a class, conduct research, provide professional development opportunities to graduate students, and offer public presentations.

Notable faculty 
 Thomas Weißer, ethics

Notable alumni 
 Lisa Badum, member of the Bundestag
Nabila Espanioly, Arab-Israeli clinical psychologist and activist
 Alexander Filipović, German ethicist, focusing on media and the digital transformation
 Meinolf Finke, German writer and poet
 Nora-Eugenie Gomringer, German and Swiss poet and writer
 Brigitte Mohn, German businesswoman and entrepreneur
 Wolf-Dieter Montag, German physician, sports medicine specialist, mountain rescue doctor, and international sports administrator
 Franz Naegele, German obstetrician
 Ursula Reutner, German linguist
 Andreas Röschlaub, German physician
 Corine Schleif, professor and art historian
 You Xie, Chinese-German politician, journalist and author

See also 
 List of early modern universities in Europe
 List of Jesuit sites
 List of universities in Germany

References

External links 
 University of Bamberg
 International Office (Akademisches Auslandsamt)
 Student website with information on degree programs, extra-curricula activities, etc.
DAAD CHE University Ranking

 
Educational institutions established in the 1640s
University of Bamberg
1647 establishments in the Holy Roman Empire
Universities and colleges in Bavaria